Three on the Trail is the debut studio album by the Western band Riders in the Sky, released in 1979 by Rounder Records Group.

Riders in the Sky specializes in Western singing in the style of the Sons of the Pioneers; the Riders became one of Rounder's most popular groups for their vocals and good humor.

Track listing
 "Three on the Trail" (Douglas B. Green) – 1:57
 "Riders in the Sky" (Stan Jones) – 3:15
 "That's How the Yodel Was Born" (Green) – 3:15
 "Don't Fence Me In" (Cole Porter) – 2:35
 "Blue Montana Skies" (Green) – 3:26
 "When Payday Rolls Around" (Bob Nolan) – 1:47
 "Cowboy Song" (Paul Chrisman) – 3:03
 "Skyball Paint" (Nolan) – 1:29
 "Blue Bonnet Lady" (Chrisman) – 2:50
 "Cielito Lindo" (Traditional) – 1:59
 "Here Comes the Santa Fe" (Green) – 3:09
 "So Long Saddle Pals" (Chrisman) – 1:23

Personnel
Douglas B. Green (a.k.a. Ranger Doug) – guitar, vocals
Paul Chrisman (a.k.a. Woody Paul) – fiddle, guitar, banjo, vocals
Fred LaBour (a.k.a. Too Slim) – bass, vocals
 Weldon Myrick  – steel guitar
Eddie Bayers – percussion
Dennis Burnside – vibraphone
John Probst – accordion
Paul Worley – guitar

References

External links
Riders in the Sky Official Website

1979 debut albums
Riders in the Sky (band) albums
Rounder Records albums